A First Open or FO, is a type of railway carriage used by British Rail and subsequent operators since privatisation. They were first produced as British Railways Mark 1, and subsequently Mark 2, Mark 3, and Mark 4 variants were produced. This type of carriage is an "open coach" because of the arrangement of the seats inside – other types of carriage may be corridor based variants (FK) or have a brake compartment (BFO or BFK).

Mark 1
First Open carriages were introduced from 1951. The first three, for the London Midland Region, were the only Mk1 FO with no centre door, seating 42 in a 2+1 format. The second batch (3003–19), built from 1954, had a centre door in the centre seating bay, splitting the middle window into two thin panes. Carriages from 3020 had a separate centre vestibule with doors and reduced-width bays, still seating 42 in 2+1 format. BR1 type bogies were fitted as standard except on 3076–3080, a test batch built with Commonwealth bogies to improve ride quality. The ride quality of the BR1 bogie became poor after some use and, in 1961, changes were made.  3101–3151 were built with Commonwealth type bogies which became standard for a time, with the weight increasing by 5 tons. These carriages were fitted with Pullman gangways on standard  frames and fitted with buck-eye couplers as standard. Buck-eye couplers can be dropped and buffers extended to allow use of screw coupling fitted locomotives. Vacuum brakes and steam heating were fitted as standard. A number of Mk1 FO were later fitted with air brakes in the late 1960s and 1970s, some retaining vacuum brakes and being dual braked.

Orders

Livery
The livery initially for Mk1 coaches for British Railways in 1951 was crimson lake and cream with black and gold lining, all new Mk1 FO coaches were delivered in this livery up until 1956. In 1956 the standard livery changed to maroon with black and gold lining except for the Southern Region stock which adopted an unlined dark malachite green. The Western Region on the other hand adopted chocolate and cream to sufficient stock to operate its named trains like the Cornish Riviera Express and Torbay Express being two examples. The Southern Region introduced the yellow UIC cantrail stripe denoting first class in 1960 for boat train coaches. Yellow UIC cantrail stripe was later introduced on other regions from 1963. In 1965 Rail Blue was introduced as trailed on XP64 stock the year before and lasted for another 20 years.

Mark 1 FO conversions
In 1976, 13 First Open were converted to Restaurant Second Open No Kitchen 1058-1070 RSO, 12 were later converted to Second Open 3600-3610 SO in 1981–82, 5 of the remaining SO in 1987 were converted back to First Open 31xx FO.

Departmental use

Mark 2
The first Mk2 First Open were built to Mk2c design in 1970, followed by Mk2d from 1971 complete with air conditioning, with the ETH supply becoming standard along with a motor-alternator to provide the lighting, heating and air conditioning. The Mk2e was introduced in 1972–73 with introduction of fluorescent tubes for lighting with the major change being the more compact toilet. The final development was the Mk2f being introduced in 1973-75 which the interior design from the prototype Mk3s with improved seating and air conditioning through body side heaters.

Orders

Mark 2 FO conversions
 In 1982–84, 17 Mk2c coaches were converted to Second Open 6400-6416 SO. 
 In 1983–84, 10 Mk2f coaches were converted to Class 488 EMU trailers 72500-72509 TFOH
 In 1985–86, 45 Mk2f coaches were converted to Second Open 6418-6465 SO later 6800-6829 TSO.
 In 1988, 9 Mk2f coaches were converted to Restaurant Lounge First Buffet later Sleeper reception car 6700-6708 RLO with 3 converted from Second Open 64xx.
 In 1988-89 / 1991, 33 Mk2f coaches were converted to Buffet Open First 1200-1221/1250-1260 RFB with 11 converted from Second Open 64xx.
 In 1989, 36 Mk2d coaches were converted to Second Open 6200-6235 TSO
 In 1990, 30 Mk2f coaches were converted to high-density Second Open 6800-6829 TSO with 72 seats were converted from Second Open 64xx.
 In 1992, 6 Mk2e coaches were converted to First Open (Pantry) 3520-3525 FOT.

Departmental use

Mark 3
Production built Mark 3 stock for class 253 and 254 InterCity 125 were built at Derby Litchurch Lane in 1975–82 with BT10 bogies with a maximum of  seat 48 and referred to as a trailer First. Mark 3a is the production built loco-hauled Mk3 built by BR at Derby Litchurch Lane introduced on the West Coast Main Line from 1975.

From 1979, seven First Open were used on the Glasgow to Edinburgh push pull service 11004–11010 with 11022 added later as 11004 was involved in the Polmont rail accident in 1984. ScotRail later down graded its First Open in 1986 to Open Composite were renumbered 119xx. Two First Open 11021 and 11032 were fitted with BT15 bogies along with 11058 fitted with BTS bogies in the mid-1980s.

With a further order for 38 Mk3b built at Derby Litchurch Lane in 1985 and were delivered new in InterCity livery with a number receiving names and being used on services on the West Coast Main Line offering a first class Pullman service.

Orders

Mark 3 FO conversions
 In 1975, 3 Mk3 First Open coaches were reclassified as Trailer First 41000-002 TF.
 In 1977, Mk3 First Open 11001 coach converted to The Queens Saloon and consists of a lounge, bedroom & bathroom, along with a bedroom & bathroom for the Queens dresser.
 In 1981, Mk3 Trailer First 41000 TF converted to M&EE Test Car 10 ADB975814 QXA.
 In 1982, 2 Mk3 Trailer First 41001-41002 TF coaches were converted to production HST Trailer First 4117x TF specification.
 In 1986, 7 Mk3a coaches were converted to Open Composite 119xx CO. 
 In 1986–87, 18 Mk3a coaches were converted to Restaurant First Modular 10212-10229 RFM. 
 In 1990, 4 Mk3a Open Composite coaches were converted to Standard Open 12169-12170 TSO.
 In 1990, 3 Mk3a Open Composite coaches were converted back to First Open regaining their former numbers.
 In 1992, Mk3 Trailer First 41174 TF were converted to Trailer Standard 42357 TS. 
 In 2007–08, 6 Mk3a coaches were converted to Trailer First 41201-41206 TF
 In 2008, 3 Mk3a coaches were converted to Trailer First 41193-41195 TF.
 In 2011–13, 5 Mk3a First Open coaches were converted to Standard Open 126xx TSO 
 In 2012, 6 Mk3a coaches First Open were converted to Standard Open 12176-12181 TSO.
 In 2015, 4 Mk3a coaches, First Open 11034 FO and 3 Restaurant First Modular 102xx RFM were converted to Standard Open Miniature Buffet 10413-416 TSOB

Mark 4

Built in 1991 and 1992 by Metro-Cammell as the main coaching stock for InterCity 225 sets, Mark 4 coaches were provided from-new with controlled-emission toilets and power-operated plug doors.

Orders

Mark 4 FO conversions
 From 2003 to 2005, 30 FO coaches were converted to First Open Disabled (FOD) and renumbered 11301 to 11330.
 From 2003 to 2005, 30 FO coaches were converted to First Open Smoking (FOS) and renumbered 11401 to 11430. After smoking became illegal on all train services in Britain the coaches switched back to the FO designation, but kept their new numbers.

Notes

References 

 Colin Marsden Modern Railways Special Derby Railway Technical Centre Ian Allan, 
 Keith Parkin Locomotive Hauled Mark 1 Coaching Stock of British Railways The Historical Model Railway Society, 
 British Railways Vehicle Diagram Book 200 for Loco Hauled Coaches  - Archive
 Michael Harris British Rail Mark 2 Coaches - the design that launched InterCity Venture Publications 
 Ashley Butlin British Rail Coaching Fleet Mk2, Mk3 & Mk4 A British Railways Illustrated Modern Times Series, Irwell Press 
 G.M.Kichenside British Railways Coaches 1958 Ian Allan ABC
 P Mallaband & L J Bowles Coaching Stock of British Railways 1976 Railway Correspondence and Travel Society
 P Mallaband & L J Bowles Coaching Stock of British Railways 1978 Railway Correspondence and Travel Society, 
 P Mallaband & L J Bowles Coaching Stock of British Railways 1982 Railway Correspondence and Travel Society
 L J Bowles British Rail Hauled Coaching Stock 1986 Ian Allan 
 Peter Fox Coaching Stock Pocket Book 1979 First Edition Platform 5 Publications, 
 Peter Fox & Peter Hall Coaching Stock Pocket Book 1988 Platform 5 Publications, 
 Robert Pritchard Coaching Stock Pocket Book 2015 Platform 5 Publications, 
 Roger Butcher & Peter Fox Departmental Coaching Stock Second Edition 1985  Platform 5 Publications, 
 Roger Butcher & Peter Fox Departmental Coaching Stock Third Edition 1987  Platform 5 Publications, 
 Roger Butcher, Peter Fox & Peter Hall Departmental Coaching Stock Fourth Edition 1990  Platform 5 Publications, 
 Roger Butcher Departmental Coaching Stock Fifth Edition 1993  SCT Publications, 
 Report on the Derailment that occurred on 30 July 1984 near Polmont in the Scottish Region British Railways http://www.railwaysarchive.co.uk/documents/DoT_Polmont1984.pdf 
 Chiltern Railways puts refurbished Mk III coaches into service 31 May 2012 http://www.railwaygazette.com/news/passenger/single-view/view/chiltern-railways-puts-refurbished-mk-iii-coaches-into-service.html
 http://www.departmentals.com/departmental/975278
 http://www.departmentals.com/departmental/975312
 http://www.departmentals.com/departmental/975313
 http://www.departmentals.com/departmental/975314
 http://www.departmentals.com/departmental/975315
 http://www.departmentals.com/departmental/975606
 http://www.departmentals.com/departmental/975607
 http://www.departmentals.com/departmental/975630
 http://www.departmentals.com/departmental/975631
 http://www.departmentals.com/departmental/975649
 http://www.departmentals.com/departmental/975653
 http://www.departmentals.com/departmental/975658
 http://www.departmentals.com/departmental/975814
 http://www.departmentals.com/departmental/975862
 http://www.departmentals.com/departmental/975999
 http://www.departmentals.com/departmental/977390
 http://www.departmentals.com/departmental/977546
 http://www.departmentals.com/departmental/977547
 http://www.departmentals.com/departmental/977548
 http://www.departmentals.com/departmental/977549
 http://www.departmentals.com/departmental/977550
 http://www.departmentals.com/departmental/977551
 http://www.departmentals.com/departmental/977589
 http://www.departmentals.com/departmental/977597
 http://www.traintesting.com/test_car_10.htm
 http://www.traintesting.com/APT-P.htm
 Departmental Coaching Stock DB97xxxx series 1983 Edition, Lineside Publications
 Report on the Collision at Great Heck Near Selby on the ECML that occurred on 28 February 2001 https://web.archive.org/web/20150221131232/http://www.porterbrook.com/downloads/brochures/Mk3%20Brochure.pdf

British Rail coaching stock